ICAS may refer to:

 Ilahia college of Arts and Science, India
 Immaculate Conception Apostolic School, a former boys boarding school in Center Harbor, New Hampshire
 Institute of Chartered Accountants of Scotland
 Institute of Contemporary Asian Studies at Temple University, Japan Campus
 International Competitions and Assessments for Schools, a suite of six full-colour competitions designed specifically for primary and secondary students.
 International Cooperation on Airport Surveillance, headquartered in Zurich, Switzerland
 International Council of the Aeronautical Sciences
 International Council of Arbitration for Sport, the organisation that runs the Court of Arbitration for Sport
 Isolated congenital asplenia, a disease